Holyrood, Southampton may refer to:
 Holyrood Church, a church which now serves as a memorial to the Merchant Navy
 Holyrood estate, a housing estate

See also
 Holyrood (disambiguation)